"Crystal Clear Ice" is a song by Swedish rapper Yung Lean, released in 2015. It was released as part of the Adult Swim Singles Program 2015.

Track listing

Personnel
Yung Lean – Vocals

Production
Yung Sherman – Producer

References

2015 singles
2015 songs
Yung Lean songs
Williams Street Records singles